"Something Really Bad" is a song by English rapper Dizzee Rascal, featuring vocals from American recording artist will.i.am. The song was written by Dylan Mills, Jean Baptiste, William Adams, and Jonas Jeberg (producer). The song was released on 29 September 2013 as a digital download in the United Kingdom as the second single from his fifth studio album, The Fifth (2013). The single peaked at number ten on the UK Singles Chart.

Music video
The music video for "Something Really Bad" was uploaded to YouTube on 2 September 2013 at a length of three minutes and fifty-two seconds.

Track listings

Credits and personnel
 Vocals – Dizzee Rascal, will.i.am, Julie Katske
 Lyrics – Dylan Mills, Jean Baptiste, William Adams, Jonas Jeberg
 Producer – Jonas Jeberg
 Label: Dirtee Stank, Island Records

Chart performance

Weekly charts

Release history

References

2013 singles
Dizzee Rascal songs
2013 songs
Songs written by Dizzee Rascal
Songs written by Jean-Baptiste (songwriter)
Songs written by Jonas Jeberg
Songs written by will.i.am
Island Records singles